Ashtead Group plc is a British industrial equipment rental company based in London, England. It is listed on the London Stock Exchange as a constituent of the FTSE 100 Index.

History
Ashtead was founded in 1947, in the village of Ashtead, Surrey, as Ashtead Plant and Tool Hire. In 1986, it was first listed on the London Stock Exchange.

In September 2018, Ashtead appointed Paul Walker as non-executive chairman of its board.

In November 2018, it was announced that Geoff Drabble would retire as CEO after twelve years on 1 May 2019, and would be succeeded by Brendan Horgan, the Group Chief Operations Officer and chief executive of Sunbelt Rentals, Ashtead's North American business.

In June 2022, Sunbelt Rentals, Ashtead's main operating subsidiary, was announced as an investor in lithium-ion battery developer Britishvolt. After Britishvolt went into administration in January 2023, Ashtead later revealed it took a £35m hit from its collapse.

Operations
The company operates internationally, servicing customers in Canada, the United States and the United Kingdom. Approximately 85% of its revenue is generated in the United States through the subsidiary Sunbelt Rentals, currently present in over 1,000 locations across the United States and Canada.

The company's non-executive directors are Paul Walker, Angus Cockburn, Jill Easterbrook, Tanya Fratto, Reneta Ribeiro, Lucinda Riches and Lindsley Ruth.

British operations
Sunbelt Rentals, formerly known as A-Plant, is present in over 185 locations throughout the United Kingdom, and has the following divisions:

A-Plant, Plant
A-Plant, Accommodation
Astra Site Services, Excavator Attachments
Brightlights
FLG Services, Lifting and Handling Specialists
Hoist-It LTD
GB Access
Hewden Industrial, equipment hire to the petrochemical industry
Leada Acrow
Live Trakway
Mather+Stuart Power Solutions
PSS Hire
Rapid Climate Control
Tool Hire Express
A-Plant, Powered Access
A-Plant Customer Training Solutions
A-Plant, Rail
A-Plant, Lux Traffic Systems
Opti-cal Survey Equipment (Survey Hire Express)

References

External links
Ashtead Group Official site

Business services companies of the United Kingdom
Business services companies established in 1947
Companies listed on the London Stock Exchange
Construction equipment rental companies of the United Kingdom
Companies based in the City of London
1947 establishments in England
Companies based in London
1947 establishments in the United Kingdom
Companies established in 1947
Construction companies based in London